Júlia do Vale Horta (born 31 March 1994) is a Brazilian model and a beauty pageant titleholder who was crowned Miss Brasil 2019. She represented Brazil at the Miss Universe 2019 pageant, where she placed in the top 20.

Career
Júlia has a long history in the field of beauty pageants. She first competed for 'Miss World Minas Gerais' where she eventually became the winner and represented her state at the national pageant Miss Mundo Brasil 2015, which selects the Brazilian representative in Miss World, becoming Top 10 semifinalist. However, after the resignation of the original winner, Júlia inherited the 4th runner-up position. In 2016, she represented Brazil at 'Reinado Internacional del Café 2016' pageant and became the 1st runner-up. She then participated at the 'Miss Mundo Brasil' pageant again in 2017, representing the region of Zona da Mata and became 2nd runner-up. She represented Brazil at Miss Tourism International 2017 and bagged the 4th runner-up position.

Miss Brasil 2019 
In 2019, Júlia represented the state of Minas Gerais at the national beauty pageant, Miss Brasil 2019 which was held on March 9, 2019, at São Paulo Expo Exhibition & Convention Center in the city of São Paulo, Brazil. At the end of the event, Julia was crowned as Miss Brasil 2019 by the outgoing titleholder Mayra Dias.

Miss Universe 2019 
Júlia  represented Brazil in the Miss Universe 2019 pageant where she placed in the top 20.

References

External links
Official website

1994 births
Living people
People from Juiz de Fora
Brazilian female models
Brazilian beauty pageant winners
Miss Brazil winners
Miss Universe 2019 contestants